Randolph Historic District is a national historic district located at Randolph in Cattaraugus County, New York. The district encompasses 268 contributing buildings, 1 contributing site, and 1 contributing structure in the hamlet of Randolph.  The district includes a variety of residential, commercial, industrial, and institutional buildings primarily dating between 1826 and the 1880s.  There are representative examples of Greek Revival and Italianate architectural styles.  Notable buildings include the Borden's Condensery (1907), Borden's Caretaker's House (1907), Town Hall (c. 1840), Dow Library (c. 1830), Addison Crowley Residence (c. 1830), The Adams Building (1874), State Bank (1874), Alexander Davis House (1851), Thaddeus S. Sheldon Residence (1851), Albert G. Dow House (1865), Resolved Sears House (1850), and St. Patrick's Roman Catholic Church (1876). The contributing site is The Point (c. 1870), a public park.

It was listed on the National Register of Historic Places in 2012.

Gallery

References

External links

Historic districts on the National Register of Historic Places in New York (state)
Greek Revival architecture in New York (state)
Italianate architecture in New York (state)
Historic districts in Cattaraugus County, New York
National Register of Historic Places in Cattaraugus County, New York